The 1913–14 Trinity Blue and White's basketball team represented Trinity College (later renamed Duke University) during the 1913–14 men's college basketball season. The head coach was Noble Clay, coaching his first season with Trinity. The team finished with an overall record of 12–9.

Schedule

|-

References

Duke Blue Devils men's basketball seasons
Duke
1913 in sports in North Carolina
1914 in sports in North Carolina